Juana Wangsa Putri (born February 13, 1977) is an Indonesian taekwondo practitioner, who competed in the women's flyweight category. She claimed a silver medal in the 51 kg category at the 2002 Asian Taekwondo Championships in Amman, Jordan, earned bronze medals at two consecutive Asian Games (1998 and 2002), and represented Indonesia in two editions of the Olympic Games (2000 and 2004).

Putri became the first Indonesian taekwondo athlete to officially debut at the 2000 Summer Olympics in Sydney, where she competed in the women's flyweight class (49 kg). She moved directly into the quarterfinals with a first round bye, but fell in a 2–7 defeat to Denmark's Hanne Høgh Poulsen.

When South Korea hosted the 2002 Asian Games held in Busan, Putri secured Indonesia's only bronze medal in the sport, after she was beaten by Thailand's Yaowapa Boorapolchai in the semifinal of the women's 51 kg division. She added this accolade to her previous bronze at the 1998 Asian Games and a silver from the Asian Championships a few months earlier.

At the 2004 Summer Olympics in Athens, Putri qualified for her second Indonesian appearance in the women's flyweight class (49 kg). Earlier in the process, she edged out Venezuela's Dalia Contreras in the final to earn a gold medal and secure a place on the Indonesian team at the World Olympic Qualifying Tournament in Paris, France. Putri failed to improve her Olympic feat from Sydney, after being defeated by Colombia's Gladys Mora on a referee decision in her opening match that ended in a 2–2 draw. With her Colombian opponent losing the quarterfinals to Taiwan (competing under the Chinese Taipei banner)'s eventual gold medalist Chen Shih-hsin, Putri was unable to proceed into the repechage bracket for an Olympic bronze medal.

References

External links

1977 births
Living people
Indonesian female taekwondo practitioners
Olympic taekwondo practitioners of Indonesia
Taekwondo practitioners at the 2000 Summer Olympics
Taekwondo practitioners at the 2004 Summer Olympics
Taekwondo practitioners at the 1998 Asian Games
Taekwondo practitioners at the 2002 Asian Games
Taekwondo practitioners at the 2006 Asian Games
Asian Games medalists in taekwondo
Sportspeople from Jakarta
Asian Games bronze medalists for Indonesia
Medalists at the 1998 Asian Games
Medalists at the 2002 Asian Games
Southeast Asian Games bronze medalists for Indonesia
Southeast Asian Games silver medalists for Indonesia
Southeast Asian Games medalists in taekwondo
Competitors at the 2001 Southeast Asian Games
Asian Taekwondo Championships medalists
20th-century Indonesian women
21st-century Indonesian women